The Melbourne Aces are a professional baseball team in the Australian Baseball League based in Melbourne, Victoria, Australia. Their home field is the Melbourne Ballpark in Altona.

History 

On Friday, 20 August 2010 it was announced that ex-Australian Baseball player Philip Dale would take up the head coaching role at Melbourne Aces.

On Tuesday, 12 October 2010, it was announced by newly appointed General Manager Windsor Knox that the Aces would play home games at a redeveloped Melbourne Showgrounds.

In their inaugural season the Melbourne Aces qualified for the finals before being defeated in the semi finals series against the Adelaide Bite.

On 24 March 2011 the team announced Jet Couriers as their naming rights sponsor for the 2011–12 season.

On 13 July 2012, after many rumors and internet hype, the Melbourne Aces finally announced that they will move from their home field at the Showgrounds to the Melbourne Ballpark in Altona. The move has annoyed and ostracized many Aces supporters from the South Eastern suburbs, but it was the only viable option for them to continue playing in the ABL.
The Showgrounds was deemed to be an unsuitable field to play on in the 3rd season. The main reasons being the Aces would not be the sole occupants of the field, having to compete with carnivals, horse shows, music festivals etc. The Showgrounds were also alleged to be booked out until late December, meaning the Aces would have to find a different home venue for the first half of the season.

The Aces won their first ABL championship in 2020 when they defeated the Adelaide Giants in the 2020 ABL Championship Series 2 games to 0, bringing the Claxton Shield to Victoria for the first time since 2010, the 24th time a team from Victoria has won the shield.

Current roster

See also
List of current Australian Baseball League team rosters
Melbourne Aces award winners and league leaders

References

External links 

 
 Australian Baseball League website
 Hewitt Sports – ABL News and Game Reports

 
Australian Baseball League teams
Baseball teams in Melbourne
Baseball teams established in 2009
2009 establishments in Australia
Baseball teams in Australia